Arotrophora charassapex is a species of moth of the family Tortricidae. It is found in Thailand.

The wingspan is about 14 mm. The ground colour of forewings is whitish, spotted and suffused with grey. The costa is greyish up to the middle and the dorsum is brownish grey. The hindwings are greyish cream, but darker and mixed with brownish on the periphery.

Etymology
The species name refers to the shape of the apex and is derived from Greek charasso (meaning I am sharpening).

References

Moths described in 2009
Arotrophora
Moths of Asia